Ronald Cornish (born 21 March 1944) is a former Australian politician. He was born in Burnie, Tasmania. In 1976, he was elected to the Tasmanian House of Assembly representing Braddon for the Liberal Party. He served as Speaker of the House from 1986 to 1988 and was a minister from 1988 to 1989 and 1992 to 1998, when he retired.

References

1944 births
Living people
Liberal Party of Australia members of the Parliament of Tasmania
Members of the Tasmanian House of Assembly
Speakers of the Tasmanian House of Assembly